"Surrender Yourself" is a 1992 debut single by the American electronica dance duo The Daou, which they both co-produced, wrote, and performed the musical arraignments on, most notably on the keyboards, as performed by Peter Daou. Taken from their debut album, Head Music, the single reached number one on the Billboard Hot Dance Club Play chart on July 11, 1992.

Track listings
12 inch single (US)
"Surrender Yourself" (Ballroom Mix, remixed by Danny Tenaglia) - 13:30
"Surrender Yourself" (Shocking Pink Mix) - 6:00 
"Surrender Yourself" (Ballroom Re-United) - 3:50  
"Surrender Yourself" - 4:20

CD Maxi (UK/Europe)
"Surrender Yourself" (Ballroom Revisited) - 3:50  
"Surrender Yourself" (Ballroom Mix) - 13:30  
"Surrender Yourself" (Shocking Pink Mix) - 6:00  
"Surrender Yourself" - 4:20

References

External links
Music video from YouTube

1992 songs
1992 singles
Columbia Records singles
House music songs